In enzymology, a N-acetylgalactosamine kinase is an enzyme that catalyzes the chemical reaction

ATP + N-acetyl-D-galactosamine  ADP + N-acetyl-alpha-D-galactosamine 1-phosphate

Thus, the two substrates of this enzyme are ATP and N-acetyl-D-galactosamine, whereas its two products are ADP and N-acetyl-alpha-D-galactosamine 1-phosphate.

This enzyme belongs to the family of transferases, specifically those transferring phosphorus-containing groups (phosphotransferases) with an alcohol group as acceptor.  The systematic name of this enzyme class is ATP:N-acetyl-D-galactosamine 1-phosphotransferase. Other names in common use include GALK2, GK2, GalNAc kinase, and N-acetylgalactosamine (GalNAc)-1-phosphate kinase.

References

 
 
 

EC 2.7.1
Enzymes of known structure